Denise Driehaus (born January 23, 1963) is an American Democratic politician currently serving as a Hamilton County Commissioner. She formerly served in the Ohio House of Representatives from 2009 to 2016.

Life and career 
Driehaus was raised in Green Township by H. Donald "Don" Driehaus and his wife Clare along with her seven siblings. Her seat in the Ohio House of Representatives was previously represented by her brother Steve Driehaus.

After graduation from Miami University, Driehaus went on to own Philipps Swim Club and the Front Porch Coffeehouse in West Price Hill.  She also formerly served on the Hamilton County Democratic Executive Committee, and was influential in electing Cincinnati politicians like Todd Portune, David Crowley, Dwight Tillery and John Cranley.

Driehaus and her family reside in Cincinnati.

Ohio House of Representatives 
With her term-limited brother, Representative Steve Driehaus, running for Congress, Driehaus sought to succeed him in 2008. With no primary opposition, she faced Republican Steve Johnson in the general election, and won with 67% of the vote.

In her 2010 reelection bid, Driehaus' seat was looked at as a potential pick-up by Republicans. Once again unopposed in the primary, she went on to run against Republican Mike Robinson in the general election. However, she managed to keep her seat, winning this time 54% to 46%.

Driehaus has become vocal in regards to a plan to scrap portions of the education reform of former Ohio Governor Ted Strickland, as well as the current education funding formulas of John Kasich.
  
In 2012, Driehaus won a third term with 71.10% of the vote over Republican Michael Gabbard. She won a fourth term in 2014 with 65% of the vote.

Committee assignments 
Committee on Finance & Appropriations (Ranking Democrat)
Committee on Economic & Workforce Development 
Committee on Ways & Means

Hamilton County Commissioner 

In 2016, Driehaus was elected as Hamilton County Commissioner, replacing her opponent Dennis Deters. Her term in office began January 3, 2017. Driehaus was re-elected to serve a second term as Hamilton County Commissioner in 2020.

Electoral history

References

External links

 
 

Living people
Democratic Party members of the Ohio House of Representatives
Women state legislators in Ohio
1967 births
Politicians from Cincinnati
Miami University alumni
21st-century American politicians
21st-century American women politicians